In the United Kingdom's (UK) 2019 general election, 650 Members of Parliament (MPs) were elected to the House of Commons – one for each parliamentary constituency.

The UK Parliament comprises the elected House of Commons, the House of Lords and the Sovereign. The new Parliament first met on 17 December 2019. After the swearing-in of members and the election of Speaker, the State Opening of Parliament took place on 19 December. The 2021 State Opening of Parliament began the second session on 11 May 2021. The 2022 State Opening of Parliament began the third session on 10 May 2022.

House of Commons composition 
The Conservative Party gained a majority of seats in the election. The Scottish National Party increased their number of seats and the Social Democratic and Labour Party and the Alliance Party returned to the House of Commons for the first time since their defeats in the 2017 and 2015 general elections respectively. The Labour Party, Plaid Cymru and Democratic Unionists all suffered losses.

List of MPs elected 
24% of the members elected in the 2019 election were elected for the first time, or were not members of the previous parliament.

By-elections

Defections, suspensions and resignations
The label under which MPs sit in the House of Commons can change if they leave or are suspended from or expelled by their party. When suspended, they effectively become independents.

Progression of government majority and party totals 
The majority is calculated as above.

* Sinn Féin MPs do not take up their seats in the House of Commons, therefore are unable to vote.
** The Speaker does not ordinarily vote, except for breaking ties.

See also
 List of United Kingdom MPs by seniority (2019–present)

Notes

References

2019 United Kingdom general election
United Kingdom
2019